Paineville is an unincorporated community in Williamson County, Illinois, United States. In the 1920s it was home to a carnival that went bankrupt subsequently. The carnival was home to many exotic beasts, most notably a 28ft Boa Constrictor.

References

Unincorporated communities in Williamson County, Illinois
Unincorporated communities in Illinois